The Mark Twain Prize for American Humor is an American award presented by the John F. Kennedy Center for the Performing Arts annually since 1998, excepting the years 2020 and 2021. Named after the 19th-century humorist Mark Twain, it is presented to individuals who have "had an impact on American society in ways similar to" Twain. The JFK Center chose Twain due to his status as a controversial social commentator and his "uncompromising perspective of social injustice and personal folly." A copy of Karl Gerhardt's 1884 bust of Twain is presented in an autumn ceremony at the Kennedy Center Concert Hall in Washington, D.C., during which the honoree is celebrated by his or her peers. The event is a significant fundraiser to benefit the Kennedy Center, which sells tickets as well as access to dinners and after-parties featuring the celebrities.

, 23 individuals have been awarded the honor: six women and 17 men. One award was rescinded by the Kennedy Center in 2018. Due to the COVID-19 pandemic, there were no awards in 2020 or 2021.

History 
In 1997, Murray Horwitz brought the idea of a dedicated comedy award, on par with the Oscars, Grammy Awards or Tony Awards, to John Schreiber and Mark Krantz, partners in an entertainment firm. The original conceptualization was an award which would celebrate one comedian, unlike the Kennedy Center Honors which was more all-encompassing, and the venue would be the White House. They took the idea to Ann Stock, then the White House social secretary. With the White House being an inappropriate venue at the time, Kennedy Center was suggested. Bob Kaminsky, Peter Kaminsky and Cappy McGarr were brought onboard and Comedy Central would coproduce and broadcast the show. At this stage it was decided to name the prize after Mark Twain.

The inaugural recipient of the award was Richard Pryor. The first two years of the prize honoring Pryor and Jonathan Winters were taped and broadcast on Comedy Central. Since then, the award presentations have been taped for broadcast on PBS. In 2013 Carol Burnett was awarded, at age 80, while the youngest recipient has been actress and comedian Tina Fey, at age 40 in 2010. The Kennedy Center's intent is to give the award to living persons, but one recipient, George Carlin, died in 2008 before receiving his award. Carlin died five days after the official press release that he would be awarded the prize. Bill Cosby accepted his award at the Kennedy Center in 2009. He had twice refused the honor, stating that he was disappointed with the profanity used in the inaugural ceremony honoring Richard Pryor. After Cosby was convicted of sexual assault in 2018, the center stripped Cosby of his award and his 1998 Kennedy Center Honors. Mel Brooks has refused the award thrice. Robin Williams has also refused the award.

Cappy McGarr, Kennedy Center board member who is the co-founder and co-executive producer of the Twain Prize, writes in his book that the mission of the prize is "to honor the greatest contributors to American comedy of our time". Each awardee has a background in humor which has been a source of joy for many, showcased extensively on more than one occasion in more than one form, and as a part of the American comedic tradition having influenced industry and culture, is a legacy for American humorists to take inspiration from. Honorees have included a writer, an actor, a producer, a stand-up comedian and a media proprietor among others. In awarding the prize to Lorne Michaels in 2004, a Canadian-American, McGarr explains that "the Mark Twain Prize honors American humor, not necessarily American humorists". 

According to a 2013 article in The Washington Post, little is known about the selection process to receive the award. A Kennedy Center spokeswoman stated, "A short list is compiled by the executive producers [of the ceremony] and presented to a group  representatives from the Kennedy Center board of trustees, as well as the Kennedy Center senior management and programming staff". However Cappy McGarr, stated in 2013, "there's really no committee... It's really a consensus decision. There's not any single person who decides." He also added the award's executive producers — McGarr, Mark Krantz and Peter and Bob Kaminsky — have always decided in consultation with the Kennedy Center's chairman and president, David Rubenstein and Michael Kaiser. He also stated, that the primary criteria is that "We try to choose people who've had a full lifetime of making us laugh and who've had a great influence on the people who've followed them".

Recipients

See also
Kennedy Center Honors, during which the following comedians, comic actors, and humorists have been honored: Bob Hope, Lucille Ball, George Burns, Johnny Carson, Neil Simon, Bill Cosby (since rescinded), Carol Burnett, Steve Martin, Mel Brooks, David Letterman, and Lily Tomlin.

References

Works cited

External links
 Mark Twain Prize from the Kennedy Center website
 Mark Twain Prize from the PBS website

American comedy and humor awards
Mark Twain
Awards established in 1998
 
1998 establishments in the United States
1990s in comedy
2000s in comedy
2010s in comedy
2020s in comedy